NGC 1410 is a peculiar lenticular galaxy in the constellation Taurus. It was discovered on Jan 17, 1855 by English astronomer R. J. Mitchell. NGC 1410 is located in close proximity to the larger lenticular galaxy NGC 1409, and the two are strongly interacting.

This is classified as a type II Seyfert galaxy and it appears to be undergoing star formation, unlike its neighbor NGC 1409. It shows signs of being dynamically perturbed, particularly along the western side. There is a conspicuous pipeline of dust and gas being funneled from NGC 1410 to NGC 1409.

References

External links
 
 NGC 1410 at Hubblesite.com

Elliptical galaxies
Lenticular galaxies
Seyfert galaxies
Interacting galaxies
Taurus (constellation)
1410
02821
13556